Paragobiodon is a genus of gobies native to reef habitats of the Indian Ocean and the western Pacific Ocean.

Species
There are currently five recognized species in this genus:
 Paragobiodon echinocephalus (Rüppell, 1830) (Redhead goby)
 Paragobiodon lacunicolus (Kendall & Goldsborough, 1911) (Blackfin coral goby)
 Paragobiodon melanosomus (Bleeker, 1853) (Dark coral goby)
 Paragobiodon modestus (Regan, 1908) (Warthead goby)
 Paragobiodon xanthosoma (Bleeker, 1853) (Emerald coral goby)

References

Gobiidae